John Bull (c. 1740 – 1802) was an American statesman and revolutionary who served as a delegate from South Carolina in the Continental Congress from 1784 to 1787.

External links

John Bull was married April 1768 to Miss Sarah Purry, daughter of the late Charles Purry of Beaufort, SC, and granddaughter of John Peter Purry, founder of Purrysburg, SC. Had 2 sons who inherited from her uncle Rodolph Pury, Baron of Pury, philanthropist of Neuchatel, Switzerland.
Marriage in South-Carolina Gazette 5 April 1768.
Inheritance reported  S-C Gazette, 19 Feb. 1787. Mrs. Sarah Purry Bull was already dead, said the obit. of Rodolph.

1740 births
1802 deaths
Continental Congressmen from South Carolina
18th-century American politicians